The Supreme Court of the Republic of Kazakhstan is the highest of three levels of courts of Kazakhstan, sitting above regional appeals courts, and city or district courts (courts of first instance). The Supreme Judicial Council recommends nominee Supreme Court judges to the President of Kazakhstan; the president then submits the nominees to the Senate of Kazakhstan for a vote of confirmation.

History
Under the original constitution of Kazakhstan in 1993, there were three high courts: the Constitutional Court (Конституционный суд), the Arbitration Court (Высший Арбитражный суд), and the Supreme Court. In 1995, the new constitution, along with the new presidential decree "On the courts and the status of courts in the Republic of Kazakhstan" altered the structure of the judiciary and decreased the executive branch's power over it; the Arbitration Court was eliminated, while the Constitutional Court and the Supreme Court were separated more clearly.

In April 2011, the Senate removed six Supreme Court judges, and further recommended that Chairman Älımbekov resign.

List of chairmen
This section lists the chairmen of the Supreme Court since the establishment of the Republic of Kazakhstan:
Tamas Aitmūhambetov (Тамас Қалмұхамбетұлы Айтмұхамбетов): 1992–1993. Continued over from 1984–1991 chairmanship of the Supreme Court of the Kazakh Soviet Socialist Republic.
Mikhail Malakhov (Михаил Федорович Малахов): 1993–1996
Maqsūt Närıkbaev (Мақсұт Сұлтанұлы Нәрікбаев): 1996–2000
Qairat Mämi (Қайрат Әбдіразақұлы Мәми): 2000–2009. Left his position to become Prosecutor-General of the Republic of Kazakhstan, in part of a larger presidential reshuffle of judiciary personnel.
Mūsabek Älımbekov (Мұсабек Тұрғынбекұлы Әлімбеков): 2009–2011. Promoted from his previous position as head of the court's Civil Affairs Board.
Qairat Mämi (Қайрат Әбдіразақұлы Мәми): 2011
Bektas Beknazarov (Бектас Абдыханович Бекназаров): 2011–2013
Qairat Mämi (Қайрат Әбдіразақұлы Мәми): 2013–2017
Jaqyp Asanov (Жақып Қажманұлы Асанов): 2017–2022
Aslambek Mergaliev (Асламбек Амангелдіұлы Мерғалиев): 2022–

References

External links
Home page

Government of Kazakhstan
Judiciary of Kazakhstan
Kazakhstan
1993 establishments in Kazakhstan
Courts and tribunals established in 1993